John Bradley Houser (born September 7, 1960) is an American bass guitar, baritone saxophone and bass clarinet player, originally from Dallas, Texas. He was a co-founding member of the New Bohemians, later to become known as Edie Brickell & New Bohemians. He also co-founded Critters Buggin (of Seattle, Washington) with fellow New Bohemian Matt Chamberlain and Skerik.

In 2006 he stated, "In Austin I play with the Patrice Pike Band, Steve Wedemeyer, Colin Brooks, Oliver Rajamani, Zydeco Blanco, and The Summer Wardrobe..." In 2008 he could be seen playing with Mingtones (Laura Scarborough) and BoomboxATX in Austin, Texas. BoomboxATX debut Feel the Boombox was released 2007.

Houser is credited on recordings by other Austin-based artists such as Aimee Bobruk (2006), OHN (2005) and Mastica (2002).  He rejoined members of Critters Buggin for Black Frames Solarallergy (2003) and for Stampede (2005). In 2006 he reunited with Edie Brickell & New Bohemians to release Stranger Things.

Also Houser has toured with Skerik and Mike Dillon. In October 2009 the trio released a CD Bewildered Herd.

Houser has also co-designed a line of bass guitars with Reverend Guitars named the "Brad Houser 5".

In January of 2019, Houser unveiled a new collaboration with Reverend Guitars -- the Reverend Basshouser Fatfish 32.

References

External links
Brad Houser on Myspace
Introducing The reverend Brad Houser Bass

1960 births
Living people
American bass guitarists
American saxophonists
American male saxophonists
American clarinetists
Musicians from Dallas
Edie Brickell & New Bohemians members
Guitarists from Texas
American male guitarists
20th-century American guitarists
21st-century saxophonists
American male bass guitarists
21st-century clarinetists